Más Corazón Profundo (English: More Deep Heart) is the fourteenth studio album by Colombian singer-songwriter Carlos Vives, was released on May 13, 2014 by Sony Music Latin. The album was nominated for Album of the Year and was awarded Best Contemporary Tropical Album at the 2014 Latin Grammy Awards. It won the Grammy Awards in 2015 for Best Tropical Latin Album.

Track listing

Charts

Weekly charts

Year-end charts

References 

Carlos Vives albums
2014 albums
Sony Music Latin albums
Sony Music albums
Sony Music Colombia albums
Grammy Award for Best Tropical Latin Album
Latin Grammy Award for Best Contemporary Tropical Album
Albums recorded at Henson Recording Studios